Gregory Alan Berger (born December 10, 1950) is an American voice actor. He is known for his roles as Jecht from Final Fantasy X and the Dissidia Final Fantasy games, Grimlock from The Transformers, Mysterio and Kraven the Hunter from Spider-Man: The Animated Series, Odie from various Garfield animated media, Cornfed Pig from Duckman, Bill Licking from The Angry Beavers, Agent Kay from Men in Black: The Series, The Gromble from Aaahh!!! Real Monsters, Captain Blue from Viewtiful Joe, Eeyore from Kingdom Hearts II, Hunter the Cheetah (1999–2002) and Ripto from Spyro the Dragon, as well as The Thing, Galactus, and Attuma from Marvel: Ultimate Alliance.

Early life
Berger was born on December 10, 1950, in St. Louis, Missouri to an observant Russian-Jewish family. He graduated from University City High School in 1968.

Career
Berger began his career in 1978. He provided the voice of Adult Chirin in Ringing Bell. In 1982, he voiced Odie, one of the pets of Jon Arbuckle, in Here Comes Garfield. Berger would continue voicing Odie in various Garfield media such as Garfield and Friends (in which he also voiced Orson Pig in the U.S. Acres segments), The Garfield Show, and many more. He provided additional voices in Super Friends: The Legendary Super Powers Show, while he voiced Grimlock in The Transformers and its feature film, The Transformers: The Movie.

Berger also voiced Cornfed in the animated sitcom series titled Duckman. In the Spyro video game series, he provided the voices of Ripto and Hunter the Cheetah from 1999 until 2002. He voiced Mysterio and Kraven the Hunter in Spider-Man: The Animated Series (or just called Spider-Man). Berger also provided additional voices for Inside Out and Illumination Entertainment's Despicable Me 3. He was also the voice of Jecht in the Dissidia Final Fantasy games and Final Fantasy X.

Filmography

Awards and nominations

References

External links

1950 births
Living people
American male stage actors
American male video game actors
American male voice actors
Animal impersonators
Jewish American male actors
Male actors from St. Louis
20th-century American male actors
21st-century American male actors
American people of Russian-Jewish descent